The eighth series of The Great British Bake Off began on 29 August 2017, with this being the first of The Great British Bake Off to be broadcast on Channel 4, after the production company Love Productions moved the show. It is the first series for new hosts Noel Fielding and Sandi Toksvig, and new judge Prue Leith.

This series was won by Sophie Faldo, with Kate Lyon and Steven Carter-Bailey finishing as runners-up.

Bakers

Results summary 

Colour key:

Episodes

Episode 1: Cakes 
For the first challenge, the bakers were instructed to make a cake using fresh fruit, with no dried fruit permitted, in two hours. For the technical challenge, the bakers were instructed to make 12 chocolate mini rolls using Prue's recipe which contains peppermint cream, in two hours. The showstopper challenge required the bakers to make an illusion cake: a cake that appears to be some other object. They had four hours to complete the task.

Episode 2: Biscuits 
For the Signature Challenge, the bakers were instructed to make 24 sandwich biscuits in 2 hours and 15 minutes. For the technical challenge, the bakers faced a very difficult challenge of making fortune cookies of two types of flavours – one is almond and one is orange, in 2 hours. For the final showstopper challenge, the bakers were required to make a biscuit board game that should be at least 40 cm long in diameter and has at least 8 elements in 3 ½ hours.

Episode 3: Bread 
The bakers were instructed to make 12 teacakes in  hours in the signature challenge. For the technical challenge, the bakers were tasked to make a cottage loaf in 2½ hours. For the showstopper challenge, the bakers were required to make a multicoloured bread sculpture with at least three colours using natural food colouring in  hours.

Episode 4: Caramel
For the first signature challenge, the bakers were required to produce 18 identical millionaire shortbread bars in 2 hours and 15 minutes. The technical challenge was set by Prue where the bakers were tasked to make stroopwafels in 1 hour and 45 minutes. Only one test waffle was allowed, and the challenge proved to be a very difficult one for the bakers with none of them producing an adequate caramel. For the final showstopper challenge, the bakers were required to make a caramel cake consisting of at least three layers of sponge in 3 ½ hours. They were required to incorporate spun sugar into their decorations.

Episode 5: Puddings 
For the signature challenge, the eight remaining bakers were required to bake a steamed school pudding with an accompaniment such as a compote or a custard in 3 hours. The technical challenge was set by Paul, which was 6 molten chocolate puddings with a peanut butter filling in 1 hour. Each baker was called one at a time so their puddings could be ready at different times for Paul and Prue to judge (starting with Julia, followed by Sophie, Liam, Steven, Yan, Kate, James and finally Stacey). For the showstopper challenge, the bakers were asked to bake an ornamental trifle terrine with three elements – a baked element, a set custard or mousse, and a jelly, in 4 ½ hours .

Episode 6: Pastry 
In the signature challenge, the bakers were required to produce four decorative savoury pies using shortcrust pastry with different designs on the pies that share a common theme in 2½ hours. For the technical challenge, set by Paul, the bakers were tasked to produce 12 pastéis de nata using rough puff pastry in 2 hours. For the final showstopper challenge, the bakers were required to produce a family-sized hand-raised pie with a savoury filling using hot water crust pastry, topped with glazed fruits in 4 hours.

Episode 7: Italian 
For the first ever Italian week in Bake Off, the bakers were given  hours to make the required 18 Sicilian Cannolis with three different types of fillings. This week's Italian technical challenge was set by Prue, where the bakers were tasked to make the well-known, yet tricky, Pizza Margherita with a thin crispy base in  hours. For the showstopper challenge, the bakers were required to make a very technically challenging and fiddly Italian bake: 24 Sfogliatelles with two types of fillings in  hours.

Episode 8: Forgotten Bakes 
The bakers were required to make four Bedfordshire Clangers within two hours in the signature challenge. Each must contain a savoury filling at one end and a sweet filling at the other, and be made from suet crust pastry. In the technical challenge, set by Paul, the bakers were given one and a half hours to make a traditional Cumberland Rum Nicky: a large tart consisting of a sweet shortcrust pastry and a rum-soaked fruity filling covered with a lattice top, and served with a smooth rum butter. For the historic showstopper the bakers had three and a half hours to make a Victorian Savoy cake, a sponge cake baked in a mold, often in elaborate architectural shapes, with a hard sugar crust or coating that helped preserve it as it served as a banquet centrepiece.

Episode 9: Pâtisserie (Semi-final) 
For the semifinal signature bakes, the bakers were asked to make 24 choux buns, in which 12 must have a crunchy craquelin on top and the other 12 must be covered with icing. The penultimate technical challenge was set by Prue, where the bakers were tasked with a very difficult job of making 9 Les Misérables slices. For the showstopper challenge before the final, the bakers were asked to make a meringue centrepiece, containing at least two different types of meringue and a dessert element, in 4 hours and 45 minutes.

Episode 10: Final 
For the signature challenge in the final, the last three bakers were tasked to make a batch of 12 small loaves. There must be three different types of loaves: four need to be intricately shaped (e.g. plaited), four need to be flavoured, and four need to be made from an alternative grain such as spelt or buckwheat, in 3 hours. Prue set the final technical challenge, asking the bakers to make 10 ginger biscuits, half oval and half square, in 2½ hours.	
They each had to have a great snap and be intricately iced with two complicated patterns. For the ultimate showstopper challenge, the bakers were tasked to make one large entremet, having a minimum of five elements, one of which must be a sponge, and covered with a glaze or ganache, all in five hours.

Specials 
The two holiday specials each featured four returning contestants from the series 2–7.

The first special featured Selasi Gbormittah (Series 7), Val Stones (Series 7), Paul Jagger (Series 6) and Beca Lyne-Pirkis (Series 4). The competition was won by Paul Jagger.

The second special featured Benjamina Ebuehi (Series 7), Rav Bansal (Series 7), Sandy Docherty (Series 6) and Rob Billington (Series 2). The competition was won by Rav Bansal.

The Great Christmas Bake Off 
For the signature challenge, the bakers were given 2 hours to create a Christmas family favourite: a Yule Log. The technical challenge was set by Prue, and allowed the bakers 1 1/2 hours to make 12 mince pies with lattice tops, served with brandy butter, with very limited instructions and ingredients provided. The showstopper challenge featured the bakers creating 8 snow globe cakes using a sugar glass dome to encase an edible Christmas scene on top of an entremet.

The Big Festive Bake Off 
The bakers were required to make 6 snowy bombe Alaska tarts in the signature challenge. The technical challenge was set by Paul, where the bakers were tasked to make a pistachio Kransekake Christmas tree consisting of twelve layers of concentric rings, topped with a star. For the final showstopper challenge, the bakers were required to make a magical ice cake with elaborate sugar work that create a scene of winter wonderland.

Post-show career
Liam Charles was chosen as a co-presenter for the revamped professional version of Great British Bake Off, Bake Off: The Professionals, and in 2019 returned as co-judge for Junior Bake Off.  He has written two recipe books on baking; Cheeky Treats: 70 Brilliant Bakes and Cakes, and  Second Helpings.

Sophie Faldo runs her own business, Sophie Faldo Cakes. She has also appeared in an episode of a travelogue TV series Travels with a Goat.

Controversies 
On 31 October 2017, judge Prue Leith accidentally revealed Sophie Faldo as the winner of the series  on Twitter twelve hours before the finale was due to air. This caused uproar among many fans of the show. She quickly deleted the tweet and apologised to the fans who saw the tweet.

Ratings 
The first episode to be broadcast on Channel 4 received an overnight viewing figure of 6.5 million, which is the channel's highest viewing figure since the opening ceremony for the 2012 Paralympics, but down from the 10 million obtained in the previous series on BBC One.  The overnight viewing figure for the final was 7.7 million (8.9 million at its peak), lower than the 14 million for the equivalent episode on BBC One in 2016.

Official episode viewing figures are from BARB. Figures are total counts including HD and Channel 4 +1.

Specials

References 

Series 8
2017 British television seasons